Edmonton-Mayfield was a provincial electoral district in Alberta, Canada, mandated to return a single member to the Legislative Assembly of Alberta using the first past the post method of voting from 1993 to 1997.

History
The Edmonton-Mayfield electoral district was formed in the 1993 boundary redistribution from Edmonton-Kingsway and Edmonton-Calder.

The Edmonton-Mayfield electoral district was abolished in the 1997 boundary redistribution and formed Edmonton-Calder.

Members of the Legislative Assembly (MLAs)

Election results

1993 general election

See also
List of Alberta provincial electoral districts
Mayfield, Edmonton

References

Further reading

External links
Elections Alberta
The Legislative Assembly of Alberta

Former provincial electoral districts of Alberta
Politics of Edmonton